is a train station on the Minobu Line of Central Japan Railway Company (JR Central) located in city of Kōfu, Yamanashi Prefecture, Japan.

Lines
Minami-Kōfu Station is served by the Minobu Line and is located 84.0 kilometers from the southern terminus of the line at Fuji Station.

Layout
Minami-Kōfu Station has one island platform connected to the station building by an underground passage. It is one of the few stations on the Minobu Line which is attended. The marshalling yard for the Minobu Line is also at this station.

Platforms

Adjacent stations

History
When operations were consigned to the government on October 1, 1938, the station name was changed to its present name. The line came under control of the Japanese Government Railways on May 1, 1941. The JGR became the JNR (Japan National Railway) after World War II. Along with the division and privatization of JNR on April 1, 1987, the station came under the joint control of the Central Japan Railway Company and the Japan Freight Railway Company. All freight operations were discontinued in October 1997, and the freight depot was abandoned as of March 31, 2001.

Surrounding area
 Kōfu Minami Junior High School

See also
 List of railway stations in Japan

External links

   Minobu Line station information 
 JR Central station information 

Railway stations in Japan opened in 1928
Railway stations in Yamanashi Prefecture
Minobu Line
Kōfu, Yamanashi